Özal is a Turkish surname. Notable people with the surname include:

Ahmet Özal (born 1955), Turkish politician
Korkut Özal (1929–2016), Turkish engineer and politician
 Mehmet Özal (born 1978), Turkish wrestler in Greco-Roman style
 Turgut Özal (1927–1993), Turkish politician
 Semra Özal (born 1934), wife of Turgut Özal

See also
 Özal family
 Özalp

Turkish-language surnames